The Argentine Red Cross was founded in 1880 and it has its headquarters in Buenos Aires.

See also
 International Red Cross and Red Crescent Movement

References

External links
 Official website
 Argentine Red Cross Profile

Red Cross and Red Crescent national societies
1880 establishments in Argentina
Organizations established in 1880
Medical and health organisations based in Argentina